The Women's 100m T38 had its competition held on September 9 with the First Round at 10:50 and the Final at 18:00.

Medalists

Results

References
Round 1 - Heat 1
Round 1 - Heat 2
Final

Athletics at the 2008 Summer Paralympics
2008 in women's athletics